William Kenneth Adams (born February 22, 1980), professionally known as Willy Northpole, is an American rapper who was signed to Disturbing Tha Peace Records. He released his first album, Tha Connect in June 2009. He is from Phoenix, Arizona.

Early life
Willy Northpole was born William Adams on February 22, 1980, in Phoenix, Arizona.

Career
Willy then reconnected with his childhood friend Tiffany J., a one-time Power 92.3 on-air personality now turned producer and artist manager under Blue Williams at Family Tree Entertainment.

In 2007, he signed with Disturbing Tha Peace / Def Jam, becoming the only rap artist signed with the label from the western United States. He was also the only rapper signed with major distribution that was born and raised in Phoenix. In 2012, Willy Northpole left Disturbing Tha Peace.

Willy has recorded with rappers and producers including Ez Elpee, Shondrae of Bangladesh productions, Trak Starz, Heatmakerz, Reefa, and Nitti.

Discography

Singles
 Body Marked Up
 Hood Dreamer
 1 Side Chick

Albums

References

1980 births
Living people
African-American male rappers
Def Jam Recordings artists
Musicians from Phoenix, Arizona
Southern hip hop musicians
21st-century American rappers
21st-century American male musicians
21st-century African-American musicians
20th-century African-American people